Stockholm Airport is an airport near Punarupka in Papua New Guinea. Its IATA code is SMP.

In a Notes To Airmen comment section, multiple people claim to have mistakenly travelled to Stockholm Airport, Papua New Guinea, instead of one of the many airports in the Stockholm region of Sweden.

References

Airports in Papua New Guinea